These are the results for the 43rd edition of the Ronde van Nederland cycling race, which was held from August 19 to August 23, 2003. The race started in Middelburg and finished in Landgraaf.

Stages

19-08-2003: Middelburg-Rotterdam, 180 km

20-08-2003: Apeldoorn-Nijkerk, 190 km

21-08-2003: Coevorden-Denekamp, 86 km

21-08-2003: Nordhorn-Denekamp, 23 km

22-08-2003: Kleve-Sittard, 195 km

23-08-2003: Sittard/Geleen-Landgraaf, 215 km

Final classification

External links
Wielersite Results

Ronde van Nederland
Ronde van Nederland
2003 in Dutch sport